KYOS (1480 AM) is a commercial radio station in Merced, California. The station is owned by the Stephens Media Group, through a subsidiary, SMG-Merced, LLC.  KYOS airs a talk radio format on weekdays and plays oldies music on weekends.

On February 29, 2016, KYOS was granted an FCC construction permit to move to a new site, decrease day power to 4,300 watts and decrease night power to 75 watts.  It uses a single-tower non-directional antenna.  The transmitter is on North Coffee Street in Merced, near California State Route 140 (Central Yosemite Highway).  Programming is also heard on 250 watt FM translator K279BU at 107.3 MHz in Merced.

Programming
On weekdays, KYOS carries mostly nationally syndicated conservative talk shows.  They include Rush Limbaugh, Glenn Beck, Sean Hannity and "Coast to Coast AM with George Noory" from Premiere Networks.  Also heard are Mark Levin, Michael Savage and "America in the Morning" from Westwood One.  The station is an affiliate of the Oakland Athletics Radio Network.

On weekends, the station mostly plays oldies music, including a Sunday morning replay of "American Top 40 with Casey Kasem" from the 1970s and 80s.  Some hours begin with USA Radio News.

History
KYOS signed on the air in October 1936.  It was originally powered at only 250 watts.  KYOS carried programming from the Mutual Broadcasting System and the Don Lee Network.

As network programming moved to television, KYOS switched to a Contemporary Top 40 format in the 1960s and 70s, and in the 1980s to adult contemporary.  In the 1990s, it switched to a talk radio format.  In 2002, Mapleton Communications acquired KYOS. Effective September 30, 2019, Mapleton sold it to the Stephens Media Group.

References

External links

YOS
News and talk radio stations in the United States
Mass media in Merced County, California
Merced, California